Glen Spey is a hamlet in the town of Lumberland, Sullivan County, New York, United States. Its ZIP code is 12737.  The town's name is in reference to the spring-filled ravines, or glens, that characterize the Delaware River tributaries in the area.  There are waterfalls and shady Hemlock (Tsuga canadensis) forests typical to the steep river valley terrain and many natural springs occur in the area.

Notes

Hamlets in Sullivan County, New York
Hamlets in New York (state)